The Journal of Photogrammetry, Remote Sensing and Geoinformation Science (formerly Photogrammetrie, Fernerkundung, Geoinformation - PFG) is an academic journal published by Springer on behalf of the  about photogrammetry, remote sensing, and geoinformation science.
Its editor-in-chief is Markus Gerke. According to the Journal Citation Reports, the journal has a 2020 impact factor of 1.857.

References

Springer Science+Business Media academic journals
Photogrammetry journals
Remote sensing journals
Geographic data and information